Joel Archambault  (born 7 April 1992) is a Canadian male track cyclist, representing Canada at international competitions. He won the bronze medal at the 2016 Pan American Track Cycling Championships in the team sprint.

References

External links

1992 births
Living people
Canadian male cyclists
Canadian track cyclists
Place of birth missing (living people)
Cyclists at the 2019 Pan American Games
Pan American Games competitors for Canada
21st-century Canadian people